Robert Browne may refer to:

Politicians
 Robert Browne (died 1568/69), in 1554 Member of Parliament (MP) for Colchester
 Robert Browne (died 1558), MP for Dunwich
 Robert Browne (by 1533 – 1565 or later), MP for Newport
 Robert Browne (died 1623), MP for Lichfield in 1601
 Robert Browne (1695–1757), Member of Parliament for Dorchester
 Robert Browne (of Frampton) (1588–?), English lawyer and politician
Robert Browne (Vincentian politician), Minister of Health, Welness and The Environment of Saint Vincent and The Grenadines

Sports
 Bobby Browne (footballer, born 1912) (1912–1994), Irish footballer
 Bobby Browne (footballer, born 1962), Irish footballer
 Robert Browne (cricketer) (born 1863), Barbadian cricketer

Actors
 Robert Alan Browne (1932–2018), American actor
 Robert Browne (Elizabethan actor) (died 1603), English actor of the Elizabethan era; owner and manager of the Boar's Head Theatre
 Robert Browne (Jacobean actor) (1563–?), English actor, theatre manager and investor

Music
 Robert Browne (musician) (21st century), Irish musician
 Robert Browne Hall (1858–1907), American composer

Others
 Robert Browne (bishop) (1844–1935), Roman Catholic bishop
 Robert Browne (priest) (1809–1895), English Anglican priest
 Robert Browne (Brownist) (1550–1633), founder of the Brownists
 Robert Charles Browne (born 1952), American serial killer
 Robert Gregory Browne (born 1955), American novelist and former screenwriter
 Robert Palmer Browne (1803–1872), British architect

See also

 Bob Brown (disambiguation)
 Rob Brown (disambiguation)
 Bobby Brown (disambiguation)
 Robby Brown (disambiguation)
 Robert Brown (disambiguation)
 Robert (disambiguation)
 Browne (surname)